The A41 autoroute, also known as l'autoroute alpine, is a French motorway. The road passes through the French Alps connecting the city of Grenoble with the A40 near Geneva. It is made of two sections separated by the N201 and A43 autoroute at Chambéry.

Characteristics
The A41 motorway is made up of two sections:
 the A41 South: 41 km long; mainly 2x2 lanes, 2x3 lanes near Grenoble;
 the A41 North: 71 km long; mainly 2x2 lanes with a 3rd lane for slow moving vehicles on steep climbs.

History
 1975 : Opened the section between Annecy and Rumilly
 1977 : Opened the section between Chambéry and Annecy
 1978 : Opened the section between Grenoble and Chambéry
 1981 : Junction with the A40 autoroute.
 2008 : Opened the 19 km section between Saint-Julien-en-Genevois and Villy-le-Pelloux including Mont-Sion tunnel (3,100 m).

Junctions

Geneva to Chambéry

Chambéry to Grenoble

External links

A41 autoroute in Saratlas

Autoroutes in France